Ryan Patrick Halligan (December 18, 1989 – October 7, 2003) was an American student who died by suicide at the age of 13 after being bullied by his classmates in person and cyber-bullying online. According to the Associated Press, Halligan was repeatedly sent homophobic instant messages, and was "threatened, taunted and insulted incessantly".

His father, John P. Halligan, a former IBM engineer, subsequently lobbied for laws to be passed in Vermont to improve how schools address bullying and suicide prevention. He has also given speeches at schools in other states about the story of his son.

Halligan's case has been cited by legislators in various states proposing legislation to curb cyber-bullying. In Vermont, laws were subsequently enacted to address the cyberbullying problem and the risk of teen suicides, in response. In 2008, his suicide and its causes were examined in a segment of the PBS Frontline television program entitled "Growing Up Online." His suicide has also been referenced in many other news stories on bullying.

Biography

Early life 
Halligan was born on December 18, 1989,  in Poughkeepsie, New York, the son of John P. and Kelly Halligan. His family moved to Essex Junction, Vermont, where Halligan attended Hiawatha Elementary School and, later, Albert D. Lawton Middle School.

He was described by his father as a "gentle, very sensitive soul," who experienced some developmental delays affecting speech and physical coordination in his early school years. Although he overcame those difficulties by the fourth grade, "He still struggled; school was never easy to him, but he always showed up with a smile on his face, eager to do his best," said his father.

Bullying

2000–2001 
When Halligan was in 5th grade, he started to suffer bullying at the hands of a group of students at his school because of his learning disorder, his passion for music (drums and guitar), and his love for drama. His father said that when Halligan told him he was being picked on, his initial response was to ignore the boys, as they were just bullying him with words. The family later said in a short documentary that Halligan enrolled in counseling, with little success. After that he moved up to middle school, where the bullying continued when Halligan was in 7th grade.

2002–2003 
In December 2002, Halligan told his father that the bullying had started again. He asked for a Tae Bo Kick Boxing set for Christmas in order to learn how to defend himself. At first, his father wanted to go to the school principal and sort things out, but Halligan insisted that he wanted to learn how to fight, believing that complaining to the school about the boys would make things worse. After Christmas, Halligan and his father developed a routine of practicing downstairs in the basement for 2 hours every night. After he had learned to defend himself, his father told him not to pick fights at school, but said that if any student ever touched him aggressively, Halligan had his father's permission to defend himself.

In February 2003, Halligan had a fight with a bully, which was broken up by the assistant principal; after that, the bully stopped bothering him. Halligan's father said that he was proud of his son for sticking up for himself. Toward the end of 7th grade, Halligan told his father that he and the bully had become friends. His parents warned him to be careful about the friendship, because the bully had been harassing him for a long time. The two boys were friends for a short amount of time. After Halligan told the bully about an embarrassing examination required after he had stomach pains, he learned that the bully misused the story to spread a rumor that Halligan was gay.

Summer 2003 
According to his father and news reports, during the summer of 2003, Halligan spent much of his time online, particularly on AIM and other instant messaging services. Halligan did not tell his parents about this. During the summer, he was cyber-bullied by schoolmates who taunted him, thinking he was gay. Halligan was also bullied at school about this; his father later learned that on one occasion, Halligan ran out of the classroom in tears. As Halligan had unintentionally archived these online conversations on his hard drive when he installed DeadAIM, his father was able to read these discussions. Halligan had deliberately saved transcripts of online exchanges in which Ashley, a popular girl whom Halligan had a crush on, pretended to like him. Later at school, Ashley told him that she was only kidding and that he was a "loser". According to an ABC Primetime report, she had once been his friend and defended him when the bullying first started, but as she became more popular, she left him behind. He found out she only pretended to like him to gain personal information about him. She copied and pasted their private exchanges into other IMs among his schoolmates to embarrass and humiliate him.

After Ashley had called him a "loser", Halligan said, "It's girls like you who make me want to kill myself." His father found out about this later because it was a matter of record with the local police. Halligan's father also discovered some disturbing conversations between Halligan and a boy with a screen name he did not recognize. Halligan began communicating online with a pen-pal about suicide and death, and told him he was thinking about suicide. They had been exchanging information they had found on sites relating to death and suicide, including sites that taught them how to painlessly kill themselves. The pen-pal answered "Phew. It's about fucking time," shortly after Halligan had told him he'd been thinking about suicide, two weeks before he killed himself. This was the last conversation he had with the pen-pal. As Halligan's father found out, contrary to popular belief, Halligan's pen-pal was a boy he knew up until third grade, when the boy and his parents moved away. When they found each other online, they reconnected.

The pen-pal had, according to Halligan's father, turned into a very negative person with a bleak outlook on life. Online, the boys discussed how much they hated their popular classmates and how they made them feel. The pen-pal suggested suicide as a way out, writing, "If you killed yourself you would really make them feel bad." Halligan's father said that the boy was the worst possible friend that Halligan could have had at that time.

The parents acknowledged that Halligan had discussed some of his worries and brought up suicide. He had told them his report card would be bad, and worried that his parents would be disappointed in him. One night he asked his dad if he had ever thought of suicide, who responded that he had, but also said, "Ryan, imagine if I did do that. Look at all the things we would have missed out on as a family."

Death and subsequent cyberbullying scandal 
On October 7, 2003, Halligan's father was away on a business trip. Early in the morning, when the other family members were still sleeping, Halligan hanged himself with a bathrobe tie that belonged to his older sister Megan, who later found his body.

Although Halligan left no suicide note, his father learned of the cyberbullying when he accessed his son's computer. He checked his son's yearbook first and found the faces of the bullying group scribbled out. Halligan had scribbled over the face of the ringleader (the same boy who bullied Halligan, befriended him, and then started the gay rumor) so aggressively he had torn the paper. John accessed his son's computer and first learned of the cyber-bullying when his son's friends told him.

When he learned that Ashley was being blamed for Halligan's suicide, John had her brought over to his house. He reportedly said to her, "You did a bad thing, but you're not a bad person." She appeared with Halligan on ABC's Primetime to speak out against bullying.  Although the Halligans moved out of Vermont, she still maintains contact with them.

He later confronted the bully who had started the gay rumor after finding out that he made fun of how Halligan killed himself. At first, he was so angry that he wanted to go to the boy's house and "crush that little jerk," but had time to think about it while stuck at a junction. John reportedly said to the boy, "You have no idea the amount of pain you caused my son. And you're still bullying him now even when he's defenseless and you are still lying to your parents about it. I refuse to believe that you are so cruel and that you don't have a heart." Shortly afterward the bully broke down in tears and repeatedly apologized for what he did. John wanted to file charges against the bully but the police said there was no criminal law that covered the relevant circumstances. Halligan forgave the boy as well as Ashley. After learning the name of the pen-pal, Halligan's father went to his house and talked with his parents. John said that he did not want the pen-pal to use the conversations for "something dark." While at the pen-pal's house, John learned that the boy's father never received any hard copies of the conversations. The pen-pal's mother came and pulled out the hard copies from under the sofa, showing them to the father for "what appeared to be the first time." While the father was looking at the copies, the mother threw Halligan out. John said that he never got a satisfying response from the boy or his family. He still visits the boy's website, which contains several references to death and suicide.

John soon began lobbying for legislation in Vermont to improve how schools address bullying and suicide prevention. He has also given speeches to schools in various states about the story of his son and the devastating effects of cyber-bullying among teens.

Vermont enacted a Bullying Prevention Policy Law in May 2004 and later adopted a Suicide Prevention Law (Act 114) in 2005, closely following a draft submitted by Halligan's father. The law provides measures to assist teachers and others to recognize and respond to depression and suicide risks among teens. Halligan's case has also been cited by legislators in other states proposing legislation to curb cyber-bullying.

Halligan's story was featured on a Frontline television program entitled "Growing Up Online", produced in January 2008, by WGBH-TV in Boston and distributed nationwide over PBS. In it, his father recounts his shock upon discovering the extent of the abuse his son endured, saying he believes that bullying on the internet "amplified and accelerated the hurt and pain he was trying to deal with, that started in the real world." Halligan's story has also been featured on Oprah in a report they did on a rise in homophobic teasing in schools. In addition, he presented his powerful assembly to many schools across the country.

Halligan's story was also featured in Max Hechtman's 2018 documentary, Stories of Strength and Hope: Preventing Youth Suicide, supported by an on-screen interview with John P. Halligan. Today John visits other schools to inform students about his son's death and how it has changed his life.

See also 

 Harassment by computer
 Suicide prevention
 Suicide of Tyler Clementi
 Suicide of Megan Meier
 Suicide of Phoebe Prince
 Suicide of Amanda Todd
 Suicide of Nicola Ann Raphael

References

External links 

 
 Ryan's Story Presentation, LLC – memorial site
 Online bullying compels states to act
 Included in PBS Frontline report, "Growing Up Online"

Deaths by person in Vermont
2003 in Vermont
Suicides by hanging in Vermont
Bullying and suicide
Bullying in the United States
October 2003 events in the United States
1989 births
2003 suicides
Youth suicides